The SIG MCX-SPEAR is a multi-caliber rifle developed by the American division of SIG Sauer from the SIG MCX series of carbines. The SIG MCX-SPEAR is primarily chambered in .277 SIG FURY but can be adapted to 7.62×51mm NATO and 6.5mm Creedmoor with a barrel change.

History
In January 2019, the United States military began the Next Generation Squad Weapon Program to find replacements for the M4 carbine and M249 light machine gun. In September 2019, SIG Sauer submitted their designs.
The XM5 was designed to fire the 6.8×51mm SIG Fury cartridge in response to concerns that improvements in body armor would diminish the effectiveness of common battlefield rounds such as the 5.56×45mm NATO (used in the M4 and M249) and 7.62×51mm NATO.

In January 2022 the SIG MCX-SPEAR was released on the civilian market.

On April 19, 2022, the United States Army awarded a 10-year contract to Sig Sauer to produce the XM5 rifle, along with the XM250 Machine gun, to replace the M4 and M249, respectively.

Variants

SIG MCX Raptor 
The SIG MCX Raptor is a short-barreled rifle variant intended to serve as a carbine, featuring an  barrel and a Picatinny rail tail interface for attaching either a compact buttstock or a folding PCB (pistol contour brace). It is available in .277 SIG FURY, 6.5 Creedmoor and 7.62x51mm NATO.

CSASS Program 
The SIG MCX-MR (Mid Range) was SIG Sauer's unsuccessful submission for the United States Army's Compact Semi-Automatic Sniper System (CSASS) program. It is chambered in 7.62×51mm NATO and has selective fire capabilities. It weighs  and features a  416 stainless steel barrel with a 1:10 inch twist rate, which is manufactured by Bartlein Barrels. The gas system features suppressed and unsuppressed settings. Unlike the handguard of the MCX, which slides off after pulling the front pivot pin, the MCX-MR requires the removal of two screws first. It features both an M16/AR-15 type charging handle and a left side charging handle. It uses a 20-round magazine and is also compatible with SR-25 lower receivers for use of SR-25 box magazines.

NGSW (XM7) 

The SIG MCX-SPEAR was Sig Sauer's submission for the United States Army Next Generation Squad Weapon (NGSW) program, as chambered in .277 FURY cartridge. Sig Sauer was chosen as the winner on April 19, 2022, designating the weapon the XM5—since re-designated the XM7—in U.S. military service.

References

7.62×51mm NATO semi-automatic rifles
Semi-automatic rifles
Short stroke piston firearms
ArmaLite AR-10 derivatives
Carbines
SIG Sauer rifles
Battle rifles